Socialist Party of Aragon (in Spanish: Partido Socialista de Aragón) was a democratic socialist political party in Aragón, Spain.

History
PSA was formed in 1976 by the Socialist Alliance of Aragón, members of the magazine and cultural group Andalán and independents close to socialist Aragonesism. The party was formed in the home of Ángela Abós Ballarín. The Aragonese section of Socialist Reconstruction, a group of members of the Unión Sindical Obrera trade union, also joined the party later. The party joined the Federation of Socialist Parties 7 March 1976.

In the elections of 1977 the party gained one seat in the Congress of Deputies, in a coalition with the People's Socialist Party called Socialist Unity. In 1978, some members of the party joined the PSOE, the majority of them from the moderate wing of the party. Other members of the party, from the more radical and nationalist wing, formed the Nationalist Movement of Aragón the same year, along with people from the Rolde de Estudios Nacionalistas Aragonés association.

The party disappeared in 1983, after several electoral failures. Their members split between those that joined the Socialist Party and the ones that joined the Nationalist Movement.

See also
People's Socialist Party
Chunta Aragonesista

References

1976 establishments in Spain
1983 disestablishments in Spain
Defunct nationalist parties in Spain
Defunct socialist parties in Spain
Left-wing nationalist parties
Political parties disestablished in 1983
Political parties established in 1976
Political parties in Aragon